Andy T. Dulin is an American politician. He was elected as a Republican to the North Carolina House of Representatives District 104, representing South-Central Charlotte, on November 8, 2016. He took office in January 2017 succeeding Dan Bishop who was elected to the North Carolina State Senate in the same general election. In 2018, Dulin lost re-election to Democrat Brandon Lofton. Dulin represented much of South Central Charlotte during his tenure in the NC House. Prior to his service in the NC house, Dulin previously served in the Charlotte City Council District 6, from 2005 to 2013.

Committee assignments

2017-2018 Session
Appropriations
Appropriations - Agriculture and Natural and Economic Resources
Agriculture
Health
Insurance
Pensions and Retirement
Rules, Calendar, and Operations of the House

Electoral history

2018

2016

2012

References

External links
 Representative Andy Dulin, North Carolina General Assembly

|-

Living people
Year of birth missing (living people)
People from Charlotte, North Carolina
Politicians from Charlotte, North Carolina
Appalachian State University alumni
21st-century American politicians
Charlotte, North Carolina City Council members
Democratic Party members of the North Carolina House of Representatives